Hema Hema: Sing Me a Song While I Wait or simply Hema Hema is a 2016 Bhutanese Dzongkha-language drama film written and directed by Khyentse Norbu.

Premise
Every 12 years, a group of people gather in a forest, wearing masks.

Release and reception
The film premiered at the 69th Locarno Film Festival.

Critical reception
Dan Fainaru praised the work of the film's cinematographer Jigme Tenzing in his review of the film for Screendaily. Jay Weissberg of Variety described the film as "visually rich though narratively challenging". Kuensel's Sonam Wangmo Dukpa also praised Jigme Tenzing's camera work and described the film's scenes as "visual poetry" and "mystic, operatic performance".

The film received an honorable mention from the Platform Prize jury at the 2016 Toronto International Film Festival.

References

External links

Hema Hema on Rotten Tomatoes

2016 films
Dzongkha-language films
Bhutanese drama films
Films set in Bhutan
2016 drama films